Methodist Boys' School  may refer to:

 Methodist Boys' School, Penang, a secondary school for boys in Penang, Malaysia
 Methodist Boys' School, Kuala Lumpur, a premier secondary school in Kuala Lumpur, Malaysia